Rail is an American rock band that achieved national fame after winning the grand prize of MTV's Basement Tapes competition in 1983. Before starting their recording career, the group was well known in the Seattle area under the names "Rail & Company" and "Rail & Co."

History 
The band was formed by drummer Kelly Nobles, bassist/singer Terry James Young and guitarist Andy Baldwin at Highland Junior High School in Bellevue, Washington in 1970. Interlake High School mate Rick Knotts joined the band in 1973.

Rail won a best local band award from Seattle rock station KZOK-FM in 1978. The band entered the Billboard 200 albums chart with its self-titled EMI America Records release "Rail". The band toured with Van Halen, Heart, Ted Nugent, Blue Öyster Cult, Three Dog Night, The Beach Boys, Nazareth, and others.

Rail released three albums and one EP between 1980–1997 and remains a long-touring staple of the Washington local music scene. Although not officially recognized on any of their albums, during the early to mid-80s several well known local artists appeared as guest performers live and in the studio. In 1985 they were joined by guitarist Ronnie Montrose for several months. He was looking for a new band, and Rick Knotts had recently left. Billed as "Rail featuring Ronnie Montrose" or "Ronnie & Rail", they played a set of half Rail favorites and half Montrose songs ("Rock Candy", "Rock the Nation", "Matriarch", and Gamma's remake of Thunderclap Newman's "Something in the Air"). At the end of the tour, there was an amicable split.

The original four members continue to perform and record together.

Discography

Studio albums

References

External links
Information about "Rail & Company" from Pacific Northwest Bands
Rail Facebook page.

Rock music groups from Washington (state)